"The Destruction of Sennacherib" is a poem by Lord Byron first published in 1815 in his Hebrew Melodies (in which it was titled The Destruction of Semnacherib). The poem is based on the biblical account of the historical Assyrian siege of Jerusalem in 701 BC by Assyrian king Sennacherib, as described in 2 Kings 18–19, Isaiah 36–37.  
The rhythm of the poem has a feel of the beat of a galloping horse's hooves (an anapestic tetrameter) as the Assyrian rides into battle.

Biblical story

The poem relates to the Biblical account of Sennacherib's attempted siege of Jerusalem. 
According to the Bible record in 2 Kings 18:13, the Assyrian army came "against all the fenced cities of Judah, and took them."
When the Assyrians were besieging Jerusalem, Hezekiah prayed to Jehovah in the Temple, and Isaiah sent the reply from Jehovah to Hezekiah: "I will defend this city, to save it, for mine own sake, and for my servant David's sake" (2 Kings 19:34), and during the following night the Angel of the Lord "smote in the camp of the Assyrians an hundred fourscore and five thousand" (i.e. 185,000), so by morning most of the Assyrian army was found "as dead corpses” (2 Kings 19:35), and Sennacherib went back to Nineveh. The Assyrian annals do mention tribute paid by Hezekiah to Sennacherib (as recorded in 2 Kings 18), and the Assyrian Siege of Jerusalem (dated 701 BC), but omits any mention of its failure or the loss of the army.

Reception
The poem was popular in Victorian England and, when the first Australian cricket team to tour England defeated a strong MCC team, including W G Grace, at Lord's on 27 May 1878, the satirical magazine Punch celebrated by publishing a parody of the poem including a wry commentary on Grace's contribution:

The Australians came down like a wolf on the fold,
The Marylebone cracks for a trifle were bowled;
Our Grace before dinner was very soon done,
And Grace after dinner did not get a run.

Mark Twain has references to this poem throughout his works, from his early newspaper sketches to The Adventures of Tom Sawyer, and it is mentioned often in biographies of him, making it clear that it was important to him.

Ogden Nash's "Very Like a Whale", a humorous complaint about poetical metaphors, uses this poem for its inspiration:

...Now then, this particular Assyrian, the one whose cohorts were gleaming in purple and gold,
Just what does the poet mean when he says he came down like a wolf on the fold?
In heaven and earth more than is dreamed of in our philosophy there are great many things.
But I don't imagine that among them there is a wolf with purple and gold cohorts or purple and gold anythings.
No, no, Lord Byron, before I'll believe that this Assyrian was actually like a wolf I must have some kind of proof;
Did he run on all fours and did he have a hairy tail and a big red mouth and big white teeth and did he say Woof Woof?...

The poem was memorably translated into Russian by Count Aleksey K. Tolstoy in 1858.

In popular culture
 The character Pam Poovey in the animated sitcom Archer has the poem's third stanza tattooed on her back.
 Sara Paretsky's short story "The Case of the Pietro Andromache" refers to the poem. "A touch here, a word there, and the guests disappeared like the hosts of Sennacherib."
 "Spike" Dearheart quotes her own version of the poem in the Discworld book Going Postal.  "The Postman came down like a wolf on the fold / His cohorts all gleaming in azure and gold ..."
 The student body of the University of Washington voted to adopt the colors purple and gold as the school's official color scheme in 1896 with a specific link to Lord Byron's poem 
 The first two lines of the poem are often alluded to in P. G. Wodehouse's stories by Bertie Wooster. As in the novel Joy in the Morning, in this interaction between Wooster and his valet Jeeves: "One false step, and he’ll swoop on me like the — who was it who came down like a wolf on the fold?” “The Assyrian, sir.”
 The penultimate stanza of the poem is remembered from his boyhood memories by the unfaithful husband Edward in Beryl Bainbridge's Injury Time just before the dinner party he is at with his mistress is derailed by the arrival of masked gunmen.

References

Sources
Ashton, Thomas L. (1972). Byron's Hebrew Melodies. London: Routledge and Kegan Paul.

Bibliography

External links

 englishhistory.net The Destruction of Sennacherib, first published in 1815.
  – The Destruction of Sennacherib, from the site, Sennacherib.net

1815 poems
Works set in the 8th century BC
Poetry by Lord Byron
Books of Kings
Biblical poetry
Sennacherib